Shurabeh may refer to:

Ilam Province
 Shurabeh-ye Malek, Ilam Province
 Shurabeh-ye Marate, Ilam Province

Isfahan Province
 Shurabeh, Isfahan, a village in Ardestan County

Kermanshah Province
 Shurabeh, Kuzaran, a village in Kermahshah County

Lorestan Province
 Shurabad, Lorestan
 Shurabeh-ye Karim Khan, Lorestan Province
 Shurabeh-ye Sofla Do, Lorestan Province
 Shurabeh-ye Sofla Yek, Lorestan Province
 Shurabeh-ye Vosta, Lorestan Province
 Shurabeh-ye Vosta Shahmorad, Lorestan Province

Yazd Province